Kyjov is a village and municipality in Stará Ľubovňa District in the Prešov Region of northern Slovakia.

History
In historical records the village was first mentioned in 1390.

Geography
The municipality lies at an altitude of 650 metres and covers an area of 15.654 km². It has a population of about 767 people.

External links
Kyjov - The Carpathian Connection
https://web.archive.org/web/20070427022352/http://www.statistics.sk/mosmis/eng/run.html

Villages and municipalities in Stará Ľubovňa District
Šariš